Grušena is a dispersed settlement in the hills above Jurij ob Pesnici in the Municipality of Kungota in the western part of the Slovene Hills in northeastern Slovenia.

References

External links 
Grušena on Geopedia

Populated places in the Municipality of Kungota